Ask for Angela is the name of a campaign in England that started in 2016 that is used by bars and other venues to keep people safe from sexual assault by using a codeword to identify when they are in danger or are in an uncomfortable situation. When an establishment uses this program, a person who believes themselves to be in danger can ask for Angela, a fictitious member of the staff. The staff will then help the person get home discreetly and safely by either escorting them to a different room, calling them a taxi and escorting them to it, or by asking the other party member to leave the establishment.

Posters are placed on the stall doors inside toilets of the establishments where the campaign is being implemented. The poster introduces "Angela" and asks several questions for one to reflect on the current position they are in. A variety of local support services are also promoted on the base of posters. The program is not gender specific and aims to help all people, so posters are placed in all toilets in the establishment. Posters are placed on the stall doors inside toilets of the establishments where the campaign is being implemented. Not all bars and restaurants in Lincolnshire and around the world participate in the campaign, so staff cannot be expected to know the protocol when someone asks for Angela at these places. Staff at the bars and pubs that do participate have been trained and will know what to do.

The program started in Lincolnshire, England, by Hayley Crawford, the Substance Misuse and Sexual violence (prevention) strategic Coordinator for Lincolnshire County Council. Crawford started the campaign as a part of a much larger campaign, #NoMore, to decrease sexual violence and abuse in Lincolnshire. Anybody can participate in the #nomore campaign by posting a picture with the #nomore hashtag and keeping the conversation going amongst family and peers to raise awareness. The "Ask for Angela" campaign is named in remembrance of Angela Crompton, a woman who was abused and killed by her husband in 2012 when an argument about redecorating his house got out of control. The campaign name, "Angela", was also inspired by the meaning of the name which is "messenger of God" or "angel".

Ask for Angela gained many approvals, and sparked a campaign in the United States where they adopted the same idea but changed the codeword. In this campaign, people can ask for an "Angel Shot" and have it be "neat" (escort to car), "on the rocks" (call a taxi), or "with a lime" (call the police). Depending on the codeword after "Angel Shot", the bartenders will react accordingly because ordering the shot alerts the staff that they feel unsafe and uncomfortable.

References

Assault
Sexual violence in Europe
Sex crimes in England
Sexual abuse
Domestic violence